Pseudoscilla pauciemersa is a species of sea snail, a marine gastropod mollusk in the family Pyramidellidae, the pyrams and their allies.

Distribution
This species occurs in the Canary Islands and the coasts of Mauritania and Senegal.

References

External links
 To Biodiversity Heritage Library (1 publication)
 To CLEMAM
 To Encyclopedia of Life
 To USNM Invertebrate Zoology Mollusca Collection

Pyramidellidae
Molluscs of the Atlantic Ocean
Invertebrates of West Africa
Gastropods described in 1999